Jogbani is a Village, a notified area in Araria District of Bihar state, India. It lies on the Indo-Nepal border with Morang District, Koshi Zone and is a gateway to Biratnagar city.  There is a customs checkpoint for goods at the border.  Indian and Nepalese nationals cross without restrictions.

Transport 
Jogbani is the economical town of Bihar situated in the eastern region  having dense population of 2,34,891 since 2001 population census. The city earns huge custom per annum  of approximately NRS 812,652,971,344,00. Jogbani city is near to Forbesganj, Bihar from southern part of it.

Road
 starts from Jogbani that connects it to Forbesganj. So, Jogbani has direct connectivity to Purnia, Katihar, Bhagalpur, Saharsa, Patna, Siliguri, Guwahati and Gorakhpur.

Rail
Jogbani railway station is the last railway station of Barauni-Katihar, Saharsa and Purnia sections.  has a good connectivity to North India and East India. People of Biratnagar and other nearby region of  takes their train from here due no railway in their locality.

Jogbani ICP Project  
 The total project cost for Jogbani  is Rs. 82.49 crore.
 DPR and DER has been completed and approved by ESC.
 Land has been acquired and handed over to SSB.
 NIT has been issued on 12.03.2010 and the bids were opened on 19.04.2010. The work has been awarded to successful bidder.
 ICP jogbani has been fully functional  from 15 Nov 2016.
  Balmer Lawrie & Co. Ltd (A Government of India Enterprise) is custodian of ICP Jogbani.

Public utilities

List of Banks 
 State Bank of India
 Central Bank of India
 UCO Bank
 Punjab National Bank
 Uttar Bihar Gramin Bank

List of Schools 
 Mala Memorial English School
 Adarsh Shiksha Niketan
 DNP School
 Sarswati Vidhya Mandir
 High School Jogbani
 Rajkiya Madhya Vidhyalaya Jogbani
 Balika High School
 Saint Francisco English Boarding School
 Zenith Public School
 Prathmik Vidyalay Khajur Bari
 Lila Public School

See also 
 List of railway stations in India

References 

Cities and towns in Araria district
Transit and customs posts along the India–Nepal border